China competed at the 2016 Winter Youth Olympics in Lillehammer, Norway from 12 to 21 February 2016.

Medalists

Medalists in mixed NOCs events

Biathlon

Boys

Girls

Mixed

Cross-country skiing

Girls

Curling

Mixed team

Team
Du Hongrui
Han Yu
Zhang Wenxin
Zhao Ruiyi

Round Robin

Draw 1

Draw 2

Draw 3

Draw 4

Draw 5

Draw 6

Draw 7

Mixed doubles

Figure skating

Singles

Couples

Mixed NOC team trophy

Short track speed skating

Boys

Girls

Mixed team relay

Qualification Legend: FA=Final A (medal); FB=Final B (non-medal); FC=Final C (non-medal); FD=Final D (non-medal); SA/B=Semifinals A/B; SC/D=Semifinals C/D; ADV=Advanced to Next Round; PEN=Penalized

Snowboarding

Halfpipe

Speed skating

Boys

Girls

Mixed team sprint

See also
China at the 2016 Summer Olympics

References

Nations at the 2016 Winter Youth Olympics
China at the Youth Olympics
2016 in Chinese sport